John Gary (born John Gary Strader; November 29, 1932 – January 4, 1998) was an American singer, recording artist, television host, and performer on the musical stage.

Early life
From Watertown, New York, Gary started singing at the age of 5. He joined his older sister, Shirley Strader. At the age of 9, he won a 3-year scholarship to the prestigious Cathedral School of St John in Manhattan. He auditioned for the choir master, Norman Coke-Jeffcott. At the age of 10, Gary had won two (2) pins of distinction from the American Theatre Wing Merchant Seaman's Club for the Stage Door Canteen. Aged 12, he toured the southern states with Frank Pursley, a blind pianist for the Mason Conservatory.

Career
Gary sang in movies, on Broadway, had his own prime time network television variety series and appeared at Carnegie Hall, with numerous orchestras.  He appeared thirty times as a guest on The Tonight Show with Jack Paar, Steve Allen and Johnny Carson. He traveled across the US and Canada with approximately 40 concerts per year. For six years he gave community concerts in over 400 cities and towns. He recorded 24 albums for RCA Victor.

Prior to national stardom, Gary appeared on local New Orleans television station WDSU-TV, as a regular feature on the noontime television show Midday. He also appeared at the Blue Room of the Roosevelt (later Fairmont) Hotel. He performed The John Gary Show, three fifteen-minute shows a week, presaging his national (CBS) show a decade later, a summer replacement for the Danny Kaye Show.

Gary was considered by many to be one of the most talented of popular singers due to his extraordinary breath control and tonal quality of his voice. He had an exceptionally wide range of  octaves. His singing ranged from robust baritone to a high sweet tenor often in the same song. Many popular songs of the time were suited to his intimate style.

Gary first recorded on Fraternity Records between 1958 and 1960. In 1960, he joined ASCAP and composed several popular songs. After signing with RCA Victor, Gary was nominated for a 1964 Grammy Award for Best New Artist. He was a favorite singer of fellow RCA Victor artist Elvis Presley. He had five songs that made the adult contemporary (or easy listening) chart in Billboard magazine. The song "Cold", released in 1967, was his most successful, topping the chart for two weeks at the end of that year. However, the song failed to crack the Billboard Hot 100 pop chart. In 1968 he voiced John Alden in the Rankin/Bass Animated TV special The Mouse on the Mayflower.

RCA has reissued some of his recordings and a 92-track, four-CD box set on the Collectables label.

He served honorably in the United States Marine Corps.

John Gary died in 1998 at age 65 of cancer in Dallas, Texas.

Discography

LP ALBUMS

LA BREA 
8010/S8010-1961 pre RCA Victor only known album on this label; probably unauthorized collection of demonstration recordings.

RCA VICTOR
LPM/LSP-2745 — Catch a Rising Star (1963)
LPM/LSP-2804 — Encore (1964)
LPM/LSP-2922 — So Tenderly (1964)
LPM/LSP-2940 — The John Gary Christmas Album (1964)
LPM/LSP-2947 — David Merrick Presents Hits from His Hits, with Ann-Margret (1964)
LPM/LSP-3349 — The Nearness of You (1965)
LPM/LSP-3411 — Your All-Time Favorite Songs (1965)
LPM/LSP-2994 — A Little Bit of Heaven (1965)
LPM/LSP-3666— A Heart Filled with Song (1966)
LPM/LSP-3570 — Your All-Time Country Favorites (1966)
LPM/LSP-3501— Choice (1966)
LPM/LSP-3695 — Especially for You (1967)
LOC/LS0-1139 — Carnegie Hall Concert (1967)
LPM/LSP-3730 — The Best of John Gary (1967)
LPM/LSP-3785 — Spanish Moonlight (1967)
LPM/LSP-3928 — On Broadway (1968)
LPM/LSP-3992 — John Gary Sings/John Gary Swings (1968)
LSP-4075 — Holding Your Mind (1968)
LSP-4233 — That's the Way It Was (1969)
VPS-6041 — This is John Gary (2 record set) (1971)
RCA CAMDEN
CAS-983 — The One and Only John Gary (1966)
CAS-2199 — That Warm and Tender Glow (1968)
KAMA-SUTRA
KSBS-2606 — Constantly (1975)
RCA INTERNATIONAL
NL89471 — Sincerely Yours (1984)
CHURCHILL
CHS67236 — In a Class By Himself (undated)
BRIARWOOD-
(no number)— On Tour (date unknown)

COMPACT DISCS

RCA/BEAUTIFUL MUSIC COMPANY
DV01-0899 — All-Time Heart-Touching Favorites (1989)
DMC1-1328 — Songs of Love & Romance (1996)
AUDIOPHILE RECORDS-ACD-274 — Sings Cole Porter (1994)
RCA
07863-66998-2 — The Very Best of John Gary (1997)
DMC-12630 — The John Gary Christmas Album (2000)
69395-2— The Essential John Gary (2001)
RCA/COLLECTABLES COL-CD
2844 — The Nearness of You/All-Time Favorite Songs (2002)
2806 — So Tenderly/A Little Bit of Heaven (2002)
2805 — Catch a Rising Star/Encore (2002)
2865 — A Heart Filled With Song/Choice (2003)
2869 — Carnegie Hall Concert (2004)
7320 — The One and Only John Gary/That Warm and Tender Glow (2004)

See also

List of artists who reached number one on the U.S. Adult Contemporary chart

References

1932 births
1998 deaths
20th-century American singers
Singers with a three-octave vocal range
RCA Victor artists
Ace Records (United States) artists
American male composers
20th-century American composers
American male voice actors
United States Marines
People from Watertown, New York
20th-century American male singers
USA Records artists
Deaths from cancer in Texas